Uday Singh (Punjabi: ਉਦੇ ਸਿੰਘ) is the current spiritual leader of the Namdhari community and is headquartered at Takht Sri Bhaini Sahib, Ludhiana. Uday Singh was nominated by Jagjeet Singh's wife (Chand Kaur) to be the next satguru of the Namdhari community.

Life and background 
Uday Singh is the nephew of the former head Jagjit Singh. He was declared the current leader in 2012 .

In 2016, the Namdhari leader was given permission to bullet proof three of his cars and was accorded Z-plus security from the Indian government after the murder of the Chand Kaur and a bomb blast in Jalandhar.

In 2018, he inaugurated a new old age home in Patiala.

In 2020 he encouraged Indians to remain at home amidst the COVID-19 pandemic.

Celebration of 550th Birth Anniversary of Guru Nanak Dev Ji
In 2019, Uday Singh organised a special nagar kirtan to commemorate the 550th birth anniversary of Guru Nanak in Sultanpur Lodhi.

Controversy 
There were disagreements and division amongst the Namdhari community surrounding his ascension as the next guru succeeding Guru Jagjit Singh in 2012.

He was attacked by a person during August 2013 in England who claimed of sexual abuse in the mid-1990's.  It was denied by him and the reason invalidated by Birmingham Crown Court finding the attack a vicious assassination attempt.

References

Indian religious leaders
Indian Sikh religious leaders
Indian spiritual teachers
Living people
Year of birth missing (living people)